John Bull (1789–1812) was a British Thoroughbred racehorse and sire. In a career that lasted from April 1792 to April 1793, he ran three times and won two races. In 1792, he won the Great Produce Stakes on his racecourse debut and then took The Derby on his only other start of the year. He finished unplaced in his only subsequent race.

Background
John Bull was "a very large, strong" chestnut horse bred by his owner Richard Grosvenor, 1st Earl Grosvenor. He was the second of seven foals bred by Lord Grosvenor from his mare Xantippe, a daughter of Eclipse.

Racing career

1792: three-year-old season
John Bull made his first appearance at the Newmarket Craven meeting early in 1792. The Great Produce Stakes was run over ten furlongs "Across the Flat" and attracted 35 entries, each paying 200 guineas, of which nine appeared to run in the race on 9 April. John Bull started the 5/4 favourite as part of a two-horse entry by Lord Grosvenor, and won beating Ormond and Hotspur, claiming a first prize of 4,200 guineas.

At Epsom on 24 May John Bull started the 4/6 favourite for the Derby in a field of seven runners, with Lord Derby's colt Bustard the second choice in the betting at 5/2. Ridden by Frank Buckle, he won from the 100/1 outsider Speculator, with Bustard third.

John Bull was scheduled to run a match race at Newmarket on 16 October against Lord Foley's four-year-old Vermin, the 1791 Derby runner-up. He was withdrawn from the match and Lord Grosvenor paid a 300 guinea forfeit to Lord Foley.

1793: four-year-old season
More than ten months after his Derby win, John Bull reappeared at the 1793 Craven meeting where he ran in a four-mile Sweepstakes for four-year-olds, which attracted five other runners. He finished unplaced behind St. George, Speculator and Cayenne.

Stud career
John Bull began his breeding career at Oxcroft near Balsham, Cambridgeshire. In 1796 he stood at a fee of 20 guineas in with a guinea for the groom, the same as the established stallion Potoooooooo at the same stud. A year later he was moved to Figdale, near Chester and his fee reduced to 15 guineas. From 1808 he was moved to Scotland where he stood at Auchins in Ayrshire at 10 guineas until at least 1810. John Bull died in the spring of 1812.

He was a successful sire of winners. John Bull was described as the second most popular stallion of his time, after Sir Peter Teazle.  

Copenhagen was the Duke's mount during the Battle of Waterloo, carrying him for 17 hours continuously during the battle.

Pedigree

Sire line tree

John Bull
Admiral Nelson
Alfred
Fortitude
Georgiana
Muley Moloch
Cesario
Gauntlet
Paddy Bull
Ardrossan
Sir Malichi Malagrowther

References

1789 racehorse births
1812 racehorse deaths
Epsom Derby winners
Racehorses bred in the Kingdom of Great Britain
Racehorses trained in the Kingdom of Great Britain
Thoroughbred family 13
Byerley Turk sire line